Provenchère or Provencher may refer to:

People
Joseph Provencher (1843–1887), Canadian journalist and politician
Norbert Provencher (1787–1853), Canadian clergyman
École Provencher, a school in the St. Boniface neighborhood of Winnipeg, named after Norbert Provencher
Provencher Boulevard, St. Boniface, Winnipeg
Provencher Bridge, downtown Winnipeg
Pierre-Paul Provencher, Canadian musician (Norteño)

Places
Canada
Provencher, a federal electoral district in southeastern Manitoba
France
Provenchères-lès-Darney, a commune in the region of Lorraine
Provenchère, Doubs, a commune in the region of Franche-Comté
Provenchère, Haute-Saône, another commune in the region of Franche-Comté
Provenchères-sur-Fave, a commune in region of Lorraine
Canton of Provenchères-sur-Fave

See also
Provancher (disambiguation)